Stenocoptus is a genus of beetles in the family Cerambycidae, containing the following species:

 Stenocoptus biapicatus Breuning, 1960
 Stenocoptus brevicauda Kolbe, 1894
 Stenocoptus flavomaculatus Breuning, 1970
 Stenocoptus griseus Breuning, 1939

References

Apomecynini